Michelle O’Leary is a camogie player, winner of All-Ireland Senior medals in 2007, 2010 and 2011. She was an All Star nominee in 2008.

Career
Michelle made her Senior championship debut at the age of 15, coming on along with Áine Codd in the All-Ireland semi-final defeat to Cork in Páirc Uí Rinn in 1995 making them the longest-serving duo on the 2011 All Ireland winning panel. Their colleagues that day included 2007 All Ireland winning manager, Stellah Sinnott, and selector, Ann Reddy.

Other awards

National Camogie League medals in 2009, 2010 and 2011; All Ireland Under-16 1995; Leinster Championship 2009, 2010, 2011, 2007, 2004, 2003, 2001, 2000, 1999; Leinster U18 1998, 1997; Leinster Under-16 1996, 1995, 1994. All-Ireland Under-16 1995; Winner of All-Ireland Senior club medal in 1995; three Leinster Senior Club 1995, 1996, 2000; Club Senior 1995, 1996, 1999 (captain), 2000, 2008 (captain); three Senior 'B' Club 2002, 2005, 2006; Leinster Under-14 1993, 1994; Leinster Under-16 1994, 1995, 1996; Leinster Under-18 1997, 1998; Leinster Senior 1999, 2000, 2001, 2003, 2004, 2007; Junior Gael Linn Cup with Leinster 1999; Leinster Senior Colleges with Coláiste Bríde 1996, 1998 (captain); Purple and Gold Star 2008.

References

External links
 Camogie.ie Official Camogie Association Website
 Wexford Wexford camogie site

1980 births
Living people
Wexford camogie players